Chapash (Sapaş) is a rural locality (a village) in Karaidelsky Selsoviet, Karaidelsky District, Bashkortostan, Russia. The population was 213 as of 2010. There are 4 streets.

Geography 
Chapash is located 18 km north of Karaidel (the district's administrative centre) by road. Urazbakhty is the nearest rural locality.

References 

Rural localities in Karaidelsky District